Network on Humanitarian Action (NOHA) is an international association of universities offering post-graduate level degree courses for humanitarian agencies and relief workers. The association was founded by five European universities in 1993; namely Aix-Marseille Université, University of Bochum, University of Deusto, Université catholique de Louvain and Oxford University. The NOHA Masters programme initiative was launched in 1993 under the auspices of the Erasmus-Socrates Programme with additional financial support from the Directorate-General for European Civil Protection and Humanitarian Aid Operations (ECHO).  In 2015 the network had expanded to include twelve European and five global partner universities.

References

External links

Universities and colleges in Europe
Organizations established in 1993